Ambrosio de Letinez is an early Texan novel believed written by Anthony Ganilh, a Catholic missionary and Frenchman by birth. It was first issued in 1838 as Mexico versus Texas, a Descriptive Novel, most of the Characters of which are Living Persons.(Ambrosio de Letinez, v)

Question of authorship
The title page of the first edition gave the author as only "By a Texian". The second edition states the author to be one "A.T. Myrthe", with the copyright held by Anthony Ganilh. However, there is no historical record of anyone by the name of A.T. Myrthe, and the writing has been attributed to Ganilh. (Ambrosio de Letinez, v - vii)

References

External links
Online book
Mention of character in another book
Review by New York Public Library
Texas literature